Hermetic or related forms may refer to:

 of or related to the ancient Greek Olympian god Hermes
 of or related to Hermes Trismegistus, a legendary Hellenistic figure based on the Greek god Hermes and the Egyptian god Thoth
 , the ancient and medieval writings attributed to Hermes Trismegistus, mainly dealing with astrology, alchemy, magic, and religious philosophy
 Hermeticism or Hermetism, a religio-philosophical system that is primarily based on the 
 Hermetic Qabalah, an esoteric tradition syncretizing several forms of belief
 Hermeticism (poetry) or Hermetic poetry, a form of obscure poetry where the sound of words is as important as their meaning
 Hermetic seal, an airtight seal
 Hermetic Press, a publishing company in Seattle, specializing in technical literature on magic and mentalism
 Hermética, an Argentine heavy metal band
 Hermética (album), their 1989 debut album
 Hermeticum (album), 1998 album by Portuguese gothic metal band Moonspell

See also
 Hermes (disambiguation)